On 6 October 2001 France hosted Algeria in an international friendly in Paris' Stade de France.

It was the first time France played against Algeria after the latter gained independence from the former in 1962. Both Algerian and French players were presented as 'messengers of peace' before the start of the game but the French national anthem was booed by many of the fans. However, the match ended on the 76th minute due to a fan pitch invasion. France has not played against Algeria since.

Match info

References

External links

 For Algeria, football remains a fault line with France

France v Algeria football match
Football, Algeria match
Algeria national football team matches
France national football team matches
International association football matches
Football, Algeria match